Gajanan Maharaj was an Indian Hindu guru, saint and mystic. His origins remain uncertain. But, his relatives are found in Karnataka. It believed that he hails from Devana halli, near Bangalore. His brother Narayana Maharaj is also a famous saint from Harihara in Karnataka. He first appeared at Shegaon, a village in Buldhana district, Maharashtra as a young man at age of 30 probably during 23 February 1878. He attained Sanjeevana Samadhi on September 8, 1910; which is thought to be a process of voluntary withdrawal from one's physical body. This date of his Samadhi is commemorated every year as part of the Shree Punyatithi Utsav. The date of his first appearance is considered an auspicious day and is celebrated as Prakat Din Sohla.

Background and biographical versions 

The early life details of Gajanan Maharaj remain obscure and his date of birth also is unknown. He is believed to have made his first appearance during February 1878 at Shegaon.

One of his biographies known as Shree Gajanan Maharaj Charitra-Kosh was authored by Dasbhargav or Bhargavram Yeodekar, a native of Shegaon. The biography mentions various versions of Gajanan Maharaj's origins. While at Nashik, Dasbhargav is thought to have met a contemporary saint known as Swami Shivanand Saraswati who was speculated to be of 129 years of age at the time. According to Shivanand he was a Brahmin who had previously met Gajanan Maharaj during 1887 at Nashik. He informed Dasbhargav about the period when Gajanan Maharaj appeared in Shegaon where he lived for the remainder of his life. He claimed to have made around 25 to 30 number of visits to Gajanan Maharaj during this period. Shivanand Swami also declared that he would often visit Dadasaheb Khaparde, a resident at Amravati and stay with his family at their residence during these visits. It is claimed that Shivanand Swami later travelled to the Himalayas and was never seen again (according to pages 362–365 of the aforementioned biography that details the conversation between Dasbhargav and Shivanand Swami). It is also believed that Shivanand Swami may have been a former resident at Sajjangad, Maharashtra, also where the prominent 17th-century saint and philosopher Samarth Ramdas lived for many years. Gajanan Maharaj was an ardent user of marijuana and hashish which is exemplified in almost all available images in the public domain from the time of his attaining samadhi.Even the temple premises where he attained samadhi had a smoking choola as a symbolic representation.

Another biography of Gajanan Maharaj known as Shree Gajanan Vijay was composed by Das Ganu who was born at Akolner. Das Ganu who was initially named Narayan by his maternal relatives had at some point moved to Ahmednagar, Maharashtra where his father had been a care-taker of a property. He was later renamed as Ganesh and his grandfather often called him Ganu, a shorter version of his name.  When he arrived at Pandharpur, Das Ganu was contacted by a resident at Shegaon, Ramchandra Krishnaji Patil who was also a devotee of Gajanan Maharaj. He advised Das Ganu to write a biography on Gajanan Maharaj.

It is believed that he had once visited Nashik, Maharashtra and the surrounding pilgrimage sites including Kapiltirtha. He lived at Kapiltirtha for around 12 years. Contemporaries of Gajanan Maharaj identified him by several names such as Gin Gine Buwa, Ganpat Buwa, and Awaliya Baba.

Parallels with other prominent saints and spiritual masters

According to his biography Shree Gajanan Vijay, Gajanan Maharaj used to consider a few other spiritual personalities such as Narasingji, Vasudevanand Saraswati (Tembhe Swami Maharaj) and Sai Baba of Shirdi as brothers. Gajanan Maharaj appeared as the Hindu deity Vitthala in Pandharapur for his one devotees Bapuna Kale. He also appeared as Samarth Ramdas for another devotee.

There are some similarities between Gajanan Maharaj and Swami Samarth of Akkalkot, another Hindu guru and mystic. They both were Paramahans and AjanBahu. They represent different forms taken from the same source .

He is regarded as an enlightened being. He received a significant following in Maharashtra and thousands visit the Shegaon temple every year. According to the Shree Gajanan Vijay, he was an exponent of  three streams of Yoga i.e. Karma, Bhakti and Gyan Yoga.

Appearances and divine powers 
According to a legend, a money lender named Bankat Lal Agarwal first saw Gajanan Maharaj in a "superconscious state" on 23 February 1878 on a street, eating leftover food which was thrown (and thus spreading the message of food is life and food should not be wasted). Sensing him to be not an ordinary man who needs food to eat but a Yogi, Bankat took him home and asked Maharaj to stay with him. In his lifetime, he performed many miracles such as giving a fresh lease on life to one Janrao Deshmukh, lighting the clay-pipe without fire, filling a dry well with water, drawing sugar cane juice by twisting canes with his hands, curing leprosy of a man, curing himself of the many bites of honey bees, etc. Some of the above acts are because Shri Gajanan Maharaj knew Yoga Shastra on his own admission in the book by Shri Das Ganu Maharaj.

During a public meeting on the occasion of Shiv Jayanti, the great freedom fighter Lokmanya Tilak met Gajanan Maharaj. When Tilak delivered a charismatic speech, Maharaj predicted that Tilak would get a very harsh sentence by the British Raj. Maharaj's words did come true, however, Tilak is said to have taken blessings of Maharaj and his Prasad which helped him in writing his book – Shrimadh Bhagvad Gita Rahasya, which is the summarised version of the holy book of Hindus, the Bhagavad Gita.

Shree Gajanan Maharaj took Samadhi on 8 September 1910. His earthly remains were buried and a temple in his name is built on his Samadhi at Shegaon. Maharaj was prescient and had predicted his time on this earth was close to getting over. His devotees had started building the temple in his honour for some time before his Samadhi-din. In fact, his Samadhi mandir is just below the temple of Shri Ram. It is said that Shri Gajanan Maharaj would routinely worship at the temple of Shri Ram during his lifetime.
Shri Gajanan Maharaj was fond of smoking ganja in his chilam and is supposed to have also started a dhooni (loosely meaning hearth, but representing a glowing chilum) during his lifetime. The dhooni is still burning and is located very near the Samadhi mandir.
At the time when he filled a dry well with water, the saint who had denied him water, saying all wells here are dry, Shri Bhaskar Maharaj Jayle, later went on to become his big devotee. Bhaskar Maharaj's grandson, Shri Vasudeva Maharaj Jayle was also a great devotee  of Gajanan Maharaj, whose Shraddhasagar Ashram in Akot is a spiritual place for devotees in nearby areas.

Shri Sant Gajanan Maharaj Sansthan
In the presence of Gajanan Maharaj, Shri Sant Gajanan Maharaj Sansthan, a body of 12 trustees was formed on 12 September 1908 so as to commemorate the holy place which Maharaj had hinted Ya Jagi Rahil Re (It will be at this place) about his place and day for Samadhi. Shri Gajanan Maharaj Mandir is located below the temple of Shri Ram. In the same area, there is the place where the Dhooni is burning. Also nearby, the Dhooni is the place where the devotees can see Maharaj's paduka (wooden sandals), the temple of Vithoba and Rukmini and the temple of Hanuman. There is an umbar tree just near the temple of Hanuman and it is said to have been in existence since the days of Shri Gajanan Maharaj.

Shivshankar Patil is the head of the trust Educational institutions run by the trust are located at Shegaon and are affiliated to Amravati University. These colleges are one of the best institutes for engineering education in the Vidarbha region. The Anand Sagar project for tourists was developed in 2005 by the trust and spans over 650 acres. It is one of the largest amusement places in Maharashtra. Shegaon is on the main line Mumbai-Howrah route. Most of the trains which are going to Howrah stops for around 2–3 minutes at Shegaon.

Gajanan Maharaj Temples are spread in various parts of the country in India, such as Indore and Dewas.

References

External links 
 Official Website about Devasthan

Indian Hindu saints
People from Maharashtra
19th-century Hindu religious leaders
1910 deaths